Qaraxanbəyli or Karakhanbeyli or Karakhan-begly may refer to:
 Qaraxanbəyli, Fizuli, Azerbaijan
 Qaraxanbəyli, Nakhchivan, Azerbaijan